is a football stadium in Kanazawa, Ishikawa, Japan.

External links
  

Football venues in Japan
Sports venues in Ishikawa Prefecture
Buildings and structures in Kanazawa, Ishikawa